A M Bisley & Co Ltd v Thompson [1982] 2 NZLR 696 is a cited case in New Zealand regarding express terms in a contract. It highlights one of the exceptions to the parol evidence rule, that is contracts that are partly written, and partly oral contracts.

Background
Thompson ordered a grain dryer to be installed by A M Bisley on his crop farm so he could harvest his grain crops early.

In the written contract, the "estimated delivery date" was a vague "ASAP", however, it had been orally promised to be installed by the next harvest. However, A M Bisley ordered the grain dryer from an overseas manufacturer late, resulting in the grain dryer not being fully installed on Thompson's farm in time.

This unfortunately left Thompson unable to harvest his barley crop early when a storm destroyed his crop.

As a result of this, Thompson refused to pay Bisley for the grain dryer.

Bisley ultimately sued him for the cost of the grain dryer, and Thompson filed a counterclaim for breach of contract for the loss of his barley crop.

The District Court ruled in favour of both claims, meaning that Thompson did not have to pay Bisley's for the grain dryer.

Both parties appealed.

Held
The Court of appeal dismissed both the appeals.

References

New Zealand contract case law
Court of Appeal of New Zealand cases
1982 in case law
1982 in New Zealand law